Sector 3, Sector III or variants may refer to:

Municipal sectors
Sector 3 (Bucharest), an administrative sector of Bucharest, Romania
A sector of Rohini Sub City, India
A sector of Vashi, India
Sector III, a neighbourhood in Getafe, Spain

Military sectors
A sector of the United Nations Mission in Liberia
A defence sector of the Bangladesh Armed Forces

Air traffic sectors
Part of a holding pattern
A sector of Anchorage Air Route Traffic Control Center coverage area
A sector of London Area Control Centre coverage area

Other uses
"Sector 3", a 1996 single by Ed Rush
Sector3 Studios, a Swedish video game developer

See also
Sector (disambiguation)
Third sector (disambiguation)